Oluewu was the Alaafin (emperor) of the Oyo empire in northwestern Yorubaland, West Africa, from 1833-1835. 

Oluewu was then bound to Shita, the Emir of Ilorin. However, he refused to embrace the Islamic religion and sought help from Borgu to defeat the Fulanis. Initially, he recorded some success in battle, but a final putsch to recover the northern part of Yorubaland from the Fulanis led to his death by Okedare lanloke and that of many of Oyo's leading nobles.

References

Alaafins of Oyo
19th-century Nigerian people
19th-century rulers in Africa